The Power of Pure Intellect is the first album by PAX, a side project of Sevren Ni-arb from X Marks the Pedwalk and former X Marks the Pedwalk producer AL/X/S.

Track listing
 "Coined World"
 "Low-Down"
 "Catch My Fire"
 "Welcome to Your System"
 "The Power of Pure Intellect"
 "Aboriginal"
 "Delicious Land"
 "Catch My Fire (Remix)"
 "Spaced Out!"
 "Accolyte (Dark Illumination)"

The U.S. version does not include the final track.

1997 albums
X Marks the Pedwalk albums
Zoth Ommog Records albums